"Almost Is Never Enough" is a song recorded by American singer Ariana Grande and English singer Nathan Sykes. The pop and soul-influenced track was written by Grande, Harmony Samuels, Carmen Reece, Al Sherrod Lambert, Olaniyi-Akinpelu, and its producer, Moses Samuels. Two official versions of the song exist. A shortened version is included on the official soundtrack for the 2013 fantasy film The Mortal Instruments: City of Bones and was released August 19, 2013 via Republic Records as a second promotional single from the same, following Colbie Caillat's "When the Darkness Comes" on July 10, and a longer version was remastered for inclusion on Grande's debut studio album, Yours Truly (2013).

Composition
The song is composed in the key of D Major. The duo's vocal range spans 2 octaves and 2 notes, from F#3 to D6.

Critical reception

The duet received primarily positive reception. Idolator editor Mike Wass called "Almost Is Never Enough" a "glorious" and "soulful" anthem and praised the collaboration between the two artists; "The simple production is timeless and showcases Ariana’s powerful pipes superbly. And who knew Nathan could sing like that? 'Almost Is Never Enough' is a revelation all around and promises very good things for Grande's debut album." Brent Faulkner of Star Pulse found the duet to be a pleasantly surprising blend of modern and classical elements and noted that the song "should be sappy but isn't". This sentiment was mirrored by Popdust's Andrew Unterberger, who observed that the song "manages to mostly stay out of the way of its two talented young vocalists... and lets them carry it with the strength of their voices, and of the song itself. The result is a ballad that’s surprisingly mature and classic sounding." Unterberger also drew comparisons to Mariah Carey, and her Boyz II Men duet "One Sweet Day" also Brandy and Wanya Morris's "Brokenhearted" in particular.

Charts

Weekly charts

Year-end charts

References

2010s ballads
2013 songs
Ariana Grande songs
Male–female vocal duets
Pop ballads
Republic Records singles
Songs written by Al Sherrod Lambert
Songs written by Ariana Grande
Songs written by Carmen Reece
Songs written by Harmony Samuels
Soul ballads